List of songs about Manchester, United Kingdom.
The Spinners - "Flowers of Manchester"
Shifty - "Manchester"
The Times - "Manchester"
Lionrock - "Snapshot on Pollard St."
Lionrock - "Wilmslow Rd."
Ian Brown - "Longsight M13"
Beautiful south - Manchester
Brian and Michael - "Matchstalk Men and Matchstalk Cats and Dogs" (And parts of Ancoats where I used to play; about Manchester artist L. S. Lowry)
Doves - "Northenden"
Doves - "M62 Song"
Davy Jones - "Manchester Boy" 
The Durutti Column - "28 Oldham" (The address of Factory Records' DryBar FAC201)
The Durutti Column - "Longsight Romance"
Elbow - "Station Approach"
Elbow - "Forget Myself"
Elbow - "Great Expectations" (About the 135 Bury-Manchester Bus Route)
Elbow - "Grounds for Divorce" (About The Temple, a bar in Manchester)
Inspiral Carpets - "Sackville" (About the red light district in Manchester)
The Fivepenny Piece - "City of Manchester" 
Gomez - "Whippin' Piccadilly"
Marie Laforêt - "Manchester et Liverpool"
Mint Royale - "From Rusholme with Love"
Oasis - "Round Are Way"
Oasis - "Half The World Away"
 Pomona (folksong) - Music hall song
The Fall - "Cheetham Hill"
The Fall - "City Hobgoblins" (Queen Victoria is a large black slug in Piccadilly Manchester)
The Fall - "Fit And Working Again" (Reception room, Victoria Station)
The Fall - "Bury"
The Freshies - "I'm in Love With the Girl on the Manchester Virgin Megastore Checkout Desk"
John Shuttleworth - "You're Like Manchester"
The Smiths - "Cemetery Gates" (about Southern Cemetery)
The Smiths - "Rusholme Ruffians"
The Smiths - "Miserable Lie" (What do we get for our trouble and pain but a rented room in Whalley Range?)
The Smiths - "Suffer Little Children" (Oh Manchester, so much to answer for; about the Moors murders)
The Smiths - "The Headmaster Ritual" (Belligerent ghouls run Manchester schools)
Aidan Smith - "Song for Manchester"
The Stone Roses - "Mersey Paradise" (seeing as it runs through South Manchester)
The Stone Roses - "Daybreak" (from Atlanta, Georgia to Longsight, Manchester)
Joyce (singer) - "The Band on the Wall"
Ewan MacColl - "The Manchester Rambler"
Hair soundtrack - "Manchester"
Take That - "Mancunian Way"
The Courteeners - "Fallowfield Hillbilly" 
The Courteeners - "The Opener"
Tractor - "Peterloo"
Tractor - "Drunken Angels and Sad Clowns aka- Manchester"
John Cooper Clarke - "Beasley Street"
Drake - "Gyalchester"
Herman's Hermits - "It's Nice to be Out in the Morning"

Manchester
Dynamic lists of songs
 
Songs